Eden is an English-language newspaper published from Mile II Limbe, Cameroon. It is published by Senior journalist Chief Zachee Nzohngandembou under the CERUT (Centre for Rural Transformation) non-governmental organization. I

Eden was created in 2004 and has since been operating as a bi-weekly newspaper with publications on Mondays and Wednesdays. Its news articles extensively cover the entire national triangle of Cameroon, with stringing reports from other countries in the world.

References

External links
Eden Newspaper Official Website

English-language newspapers published in Africa
Newspapers published in Cameroon
Publications with year of establishment missing